The 3rd Royal Tank Regiment (3 RTR) was an armoured regiment of the British Army in existence from 1917 until 1992. It was part of the Royal Tank Regiment, itself part of the Royal Armoured Corps. It originally saw action as C Battalion, Tank Corps in 1917.

History

In 1916 the Machine Gun Corps formed a Heavy Section, later Branch, in order to crew the first tanks. C Company was formed at Bisley and sent to France, after offensives in 1916 the Heavy Section became the Heavy Branch and "C" Company was expanded to Battalion strength. The Heavy Branch was then reformed in to a new Tank Corps and "C" Battalion then fought from Cambrai to the end of the war, being re-equipped with Whippet tanks in 1918. Lieutenant Cecil Sewell won the Battalion's only Victoria Cross for an outstanding act of bravery at Frémicourt in August of that year.

Post war, the Tank Corps was trimmed down and received the Royal prefix with the lettered battalions being numbered and "C" became 3rd Tank Corps. In 1939 the 3 RTR was retitled from "3rd Royal Tank Regiment".

With the outbreak of the Second World War the army was once more deployed to France. In 1940, 3 RTR, commanded by Lieutenant Colonel Reginald Keller, was preparing for deployment as part of 1st Armoured Division when it was diverted at short notice to Calais. Here it fought during the four-day Siege of Calais, part of the Battle of France. All of its tanks were lost, and many personnel were killed or taken prisoner, but some escaped to Dunkirk or were evacuated from Calais before the port fell.

The regiment was subsequently rebuilt in the United Kingdom as part of 3rd Armoured Brigade, its original parent formation. Shipped to the Middle East, it was part of the 1st Armoured Brigade when it was sent to defend Greece to try to stem the German invasion in March 1941. From May to mid November 1941, there was a period of reorganisation in Egypt. In 1942, it briefly amalgamated with the 5th Royal Tank Regiment, as the 3rd/5th Royal Tank Regiment, returning to its previous title a month later. It was then attached to 8th Armoured Brigade. 3 RTR was transferred back to the UK in late 1943 joining 29th Armoured Brigade.

After the war in 1959, it amalgamated with the 6th Royal Tank Regiment without change of title. In 1973 and again in 1974 the regiment was deployed to Northern Ireland during the Troubles. In 1992, 3 RTR amalgamated with the 2nd Royal Tank Regiment under that name.

Commanding officers

The commanding officers have been:
1943-1944: Lt.-Col. David A. Silvertop (died Sint Anthonis, Netherlands)
1957–1959: Lt.-Col. Richard Ward
1959–1960: Lt.-Col. Peter A.L. Vaux
1960–1962: Lt.-Col. Allan Taylor
1962–1964: Lt.-Col. John C. Barras
1964–1966: Lt.-Col. David T. Grantham
1966–1969: Lt.-Col. Michael A. Sanders
1969–1971: Lt.-Col. Richard M. Jerram
1971–1973: Lt.-Col. John G.R. Dixon
1973–1976: Lt.-Col. Gregory Read
1976–1978: Lt.-Col. R. Christopher J. Dick
1978–1981: Lt.-Col. William A. Allen
1981–1983: Lt.-Col. Richard S. Evans
1983–1986: Lt.-Col. John Woodward
1986–1988: Lt.-Col. Michael J. Napper
1988–1991: Lt.-Col. Rodney W. Brummitt
1991–1992: Lt.-Col. Andrew Ridgway

See also
 Bob Crisp
 Peter Elstob
 Fred Kite

Citations

References
 3rd Royal Tank Regiment at regiments.org
 Orders of Battle.com

Further reading
Taming the panzers: Monty's tank battalions: 3 RTR at war, by Patrick Delaforce. Sutton, 2000.  (2000),  (2003 pbk)
 The Gods Were Neutral: A British Tank Officer's Very Personal Account of the Ill-Fated Greek Campaign in WWII by Bob Crisp, 1959 
 Brazen Chariots: An Account of Tank Warfare in the Western Desert, November–December 1941, by Bob Crisp, 1959,

External links
 3RTR - Armoured Farmers
  Merseyside RTR (Brian Gills website)

Military units and formations established in 1917
Military units and formations disestablished in 1992
3-003 Royal Tank Regiment